Petr Mlsna (born 13 November 1978) is a Czech politician, who served as Chairman of the Government Legislative Council and Minister without Portfolio of the Czech Republic from December 2012 to July 2013. He was appointed to Petr Nečas' Cabinet as an independent on 12 December 2012.

References

1978 births
Living people
Government ministers of the Czech Republic
Charles University alumni
21st-century Czech lawyers
Recipients of Medal of Merit (Czech Republic)